Nicolaas Matsier (born Krommenie, 25 May 1945) is a Dutch novelist. Nicolaas Matsier is a pseudonym of Tjit Reinsma.

Prizes
 1987: Zilveren Griffel for Ida stak een zebra over.
 1995: Ferdinand Bordewijk Prize for his novel Gesloten huis. 
 1995: Mekka Prize for Gesloten huis.
 2005: E. du Perron Prize for Het achtenveertigste uur.

Bibliography (selection) 
 1976 - Oud Zuid
 1986 - Ida stak een zebra over
 1994 - Gesloten huis
 1998 - Een sluimerend systeem (essays)
 2005 - Het achtenveertigste uur
 2011 - Met 4 3/4 kus - Brieven aan kinderen, maar niet alleen, translation of letters by Lewis Carroll.
 2012 - Notities over de man en het werk, introductory essay in the book about the works of the artist Jan van der Kooi.
 2015 - Op 't duin - duingedichten en duingezichten, a compilation with poems and essays illustrating how sand dunes have been a source of inspiration for poets and artists.

References

1945 births
Living people
20th-century Dutch novelists
20th-century Dutch male writers
21st-century Dutch novelists
Dutch male novelists
Ferdinand Bordewijk Prize winners
People from Zaanstad
21st-century Dutch male writers
20th-century pseudonymous writers
21st-century pseudonymous writers